The 2002 NCAA Division I Men's Golf Championships were contested at the 64th annual NCAA-sanctioned golf tournament for determining the individual and team national champions of men's collegiate golf at the Division I level in the United States.

The tournament was held at the Ohio State University Golf Club in Columbus, Ohio.

Minnesota won the team championship, the Golden Gophers' first NCAA title.

Troy Matteson, from Georgia Tech, won the individual title.

Qualifying
The NCAA held three regional qualifying tournaments, with the top ten teams from each event qualifying for the national championship.

Individual results

Individual champion
 Troy Matteson, Georgia Tech (276)

Team results

DC = Defending champions
Debut appearance

References

NCAA Men's Golf Championship
Golf in Ohio
NCAA Golf Championship
NCAA Golf Championship
NCAA Golf Championship